"My Maria" is a song co-written by B. W. Stevenson and Daniel Moore. Lindy Blaskey, music publisher at ABC/Dunhill Records thought Daniel Moore had a possible hit with his verse and chorus, but couldn't get him to finish the song.  So Lindy Blaskey took what Daniel had so far and asked B.W. Stevenson to finish writing it with  an additional verse.  David Kershenbaum, Stevenson's producer at RCA agreed with Lindy Blaskey that is sounded like a hit and produced and released "My Maria" as a single in August 1973. The song became a Top 10 hit, peaking at No. 9 on the US pop chart. It remained in the Top 40 for twelve weeks. In addition, "My Maria" spent one week at No. 1 on the US adult contemporary chart.  The guitar portion of the track was played by Larry Carlton.  A cover version by Brooks & Dunn reached No. 1 on the US country music chart and won the 1997 Grammy for Country Performance by a Duo or Group with Vocal.

Chart history

Brooks & Dunn version

When country music duo Brooks & Dunn released a cover version of "My Maria" in 1996, the song reached No. 1 on the US country chart. Their version of the song appears on their album Borderline, released in 1996 on Arista Records. In addition, their version was the No. 1 country song of 1996 according to Billboard, and won the duo its second Grammy Award for Best Country Performance by a Vocal Group or Duo.

In addition, this song was performed as their last performance as a duo at the 2010 ACM Awards on April 18, 2010, as well at the 50th anniversary of the ACM Awards on April 19, 2015.

In 2019, Brooks & Dunn re-recorded "My Maria" with American country music artist Thomas Rhett for their album Reboot.

Chart history
"My Maria" debuted at number 30 on the U.S. Billboard Hot Country Songs chart for the week of April 6, 1996.

Year-end charts

See also
 List of 1970s one-hit wonders in the United States

References

1973 singles
1996 singles
1973 songs
B. W. Stevenson songs
Brooks & Dunn songs
Thomas Rhett songs
Billboard Hot Country Songs number-one singles of the year
Songs written by Daniel Moore (musician)
Song recordings produced by Don Cook
RCA Records singles
Arista Nashville singles
Arista Records singles